Big Creek Township is one of twelve townships in White County, Indiana, United States. As of the 2010 census, its population was 819 and it contained 362 housing units.

Big Creek Township was established in 1834, and named after Big Creek.

Geography

Cities, towns, villages
 Chalmers

Unincorporated towns
 Smithson at 
(This list is based on USGS data and may include former settlements.)

Adjacent townships
 Honey Creek Township (north)
 Union Township (northeast)
 Jefferson Township, Carroll County (east)
 Prairie Township (south)
 West Point Township (west)

Cemeteries
The township contains these two cemeteries: High and Lane.

School districts
 Frontier School Corporation

Political districts
 Indiana's 4th congressional district
 State House District 15
 State Senate District 07

References
 
 United States Census Bureau 2007 TIGER/Line Shapefiles
 IndianaMap

External links
 Indiana Township Association
 United Township Association of Indiana

Townships in White County, Indiana
Townships in Indiana